Buckeyes are a confection made from a peanut butter fudge partially dipped in chocolate to leave a circle of peanut butter visible. Buckeyes are similar to peanut butter balls (or peanut-butter-filled chocolate balls), which are completely covered in chocolate. 

Named for their resemblance to the poisonous nut of the Ohio buckeye tree, the state tree of Ohio, this candy is particularly popular in Ohio and neighboring states.

It is common for Ohioans to make buckeyes at home, but they are also available in mail-order catalogs and candy shops.

The dessert is not known prior to the 1960s or 1970s, originally being prepared by home cooks in their kitchens. One recipe included butter, crunchy or creamy peanut butter, powdered sugar, and chocolate chips. Peanut butter and butter are blended and powdered sugar is added gradually before it is rolled into small balls and dipped in melted chocolate.

See also 
 Chocolate balls
 Cuisine of the Midwestern United States
 Peanut butter cup
 List of peanut dishes

References

External links 
 Traditional state foods & recipes
 Peanut Butter Balls

American confectionery
Candy
Chocolate confectionery
Peanut dishes
Cuisine of Ohio